The Mauritian Wildlife Foundation (MWF) is an independent, non-governmental, non-profit conservation agency working in Mauritius to save threatened endemic local flora and fauna.

History 
The Mauritian Wildlife Appeal Fund was established in 1984 under the initiative of naturalist Gerald Durrell and the Jersey Wildlife Preservation Trust principally to raise funds for the conservation of endemic Mauritius wildlife. The conservation work in Mauritius began as a species orientated program concentrating on a few critically endangered species, including the Mauritius kestrel and the pink pigeon. The initiation of the conservation program in 1976 was popularized by Gerald Durrell in his book Golden Bats and Pink Pigeons.

In 1996, the organization expanded its operations to habitat restoration, including the management of native forests and small islands. The evolution of MWF from a funding and administration organization to that of a hands-on conservation agency was reflected in the new name adopted that year, the Mauritian Wildlife Foundation.

The Foundation is now perfecting whole ecosystem management and restoration, which includes predator and pest (weed) control. It also has captive breeding programs for animals, and endemic plant nurseries. This work is being done at Brise Fer in the Black River Gorges National Park, and on the islands of Ile aux Aigrettes, Round Island, and Rodrigues Island.

In 1998, MWF expanded its activities into two new fields: ecotourism on Ile aux Aigrettes and an Environmental Education programme in Rodrigues.

The MWF is currently working to conserve the following species:
Pink pigeon
Mauritius kestrel
Echo parakeet
Rodrigues fruit bat
Mauritius fody
Mauritius cuckoo-shrike
Mauritius bulbul
Mauritius paradise flycatcher
Mauritius olive white-eye
 Day gecko species of the genus Phelsuma
 Night geckos species of the genus Nactus
Round Island boa
Telfair's skink
 Bojer's skink Gongylomorphus bojerii
Macchabe skink
Bouton skink Cryptoblepharus boutonii

In 2020, in the aftermath of the MV Wakashio oil spill reaching Ile aux Aigrettes which occurred during the Corona Virus Pandemic lockdown, an important rescue was coordinated, engineered and financed by the Jean Boulle Group (owned by Mauritian Jean-Raymond Boulle)  working closely with Mauritian Wildlife Foundation, (MWF)Durrell Wildlife Conservation Trust, BirdLife International, National Parks and Conservation Service of Mauritius (NPCS), and the Forestry Service. The Jean Boulle Group provided its corporate executive jet to enable the emergency rescue of three species of rare reptiles (Gongylomorphus bojerii Cryptoblepharus boutonii),*lesser night gecko) which might otherwise be facing extinction, following the Wakashio oil spill in Mauritius. Small numbers of lesser night geckos, Bojer’s skinks (Critically Endangered (IUCN 3.1)), and Bouton’s skinks were captured by MWF from the southeast islands of Mauritius and held in a temporary bio-secure holding facility on the mainland. The reptiles were safely transported to Jersey Zoo by the Jean Boulle Group plane where they have received expert care from leading herpetologists and this safety net population forms part of a breeding programme from which the animals, their offspring or future generations can eventually be released back into the wild. Moving the reptiles to Jersey is a lifeline in establishing assurance populations of these animals and their unique genes away from the disaster zone until the long-term impacts of the MV Wakashio oil spill are fully understood. These offshore islands offer a unique diversity in plant and animal life and are home to some of the world’s rarest species, which are found nowhere else on Earth.

See also 
 Gerald Durrell
 Durrell Wildlife Conservation Trust
 Wildlife Trust (US)
 Wildlife Preservation Canada

References

External links 
 Mauritian Wildlife Foundation
 An article in The Independent, London.

 Environmental organisations based in Mauritius
Conservation and environmental foundations